Hoh Chunde (born 4 May 1909, date of death unknown) was a Chinese athlete. He competed in the men's long jump and the men's javelin throw at the 1936 Summer Olympics.

References

1909 births
Year of death missing
Athletes (track and field) at the 1936 Summer Olympics
Chinese male long jumpers
Chinese male javelin throwers
Olympic athletes of China
Place of birth missing
20th-century Chinese people